The 2013 FIFA Club World Cup (officially known as the FIFA Club World Cup Morocco 2013 presented by Toyota for sponsorship reasons) was the 10th edition of the FIFA Club World Cup, a FIFA-organised international club football tournament between the winners of the six continental confederations as well as the host nation's league champions. It was hosted by Morocco, and played from 11 to 21 December 2013.

Defending champions Corinthians did not qualify as they were eliminated in the round of 16 of the 2013 Copa Libertadores. The eventual winners of that competition, Atlético Mineiro, were beaten in the semi-finals of the Club World Cup by Moroccan side Raja Casablanca, whose appearance in the final made them the first club to appear in all four rounds of the competition, having entered in the play-off for the quarter-finals; however, they were unable to make history by winning the title, as European champions Bayern Munich won the final 2–0 for their first Club World Cup title.

Host bids
There were four countries bidding to host the 2013 and 2014 tournaments (same host for both tournaments):

 (which hosted the 2009 and 2010 editions in Abu Dhabi)

In October 2011, FIFA said that Iran, South Africa and the United Arab Emirates all withdrew their bids, leaving Morocco as the only bidder. The FIFA Executive Committee officially confirmed Morocco as host on 17 December 2011 during their meeting in Tokyo, Japan.

Qualified teams

Venues
The venues for the 2013 FIFA Club World Cup were in Marrakesh and Agadir.

Organisation

Emblem
The official emblem of the tournament was unveiled in Casablanca on 2 September 2013.

Ticketing
Pre-sale tickets were available from 14 to 27 October 2013, while the open sales phase began on 28 October 2013.

Trophy tour
A tour of the FIFA Club World Cup Trophy took place from October to December 2013, starting from Yokohama, the site of the 2012 FIFA Club World Cup Final, before visiting the cities of each participating team, and ending at Casablanca before the start of the tournament.

Refereeing

Match officials
The appointed match officials were:

Goal-line technology
For the second year in a row, goal-line technology was used for the tournament. GoalControl GmbH was chosen as the official goal-line technology provider.

Vanishing spray
Following successful trials at the 2013 FIFA U-20 World Cup and 2013 FIFA U-17 World Cup, FIFA approved the vanishing spray to be used by the tournament referees to mark the ten-yard line for the defending team during a free kick.

Squads

Each team named a 23-man squad (three of whom must be goalkeepers) by the FIFA deadline of 29 November 2013. Injury replacements were allowed until 24 hours before the team's first match.

A total of 31 nationalities were represented in the squads of the seven teams.

Matches
The draw was held on 9 October 2013 at 19:00 WEST (UTC+1), at the La Mamounia Hotel in Marrakesh, to decide the "positions" in the bracket for the three teams which entered the quarter-finals (champions of AFC, CAF, and CONCACAF).

If a match was tied after normal playing time:
For elimination matches, extra time was played. If still tied after extra time, a penalty shoot-out was held to determine the winner.
For the matches for fifth place and third place, no extra time was played, and a penalty shoot-out was held to determine the winner.

All times are local, WET (UTC±0).

Play-off for quarter-finals

Quarter-finals

Semi-finals

Match for fifth place

Match for third place

Final

Goalscorers

Awards

FIFA also named a man of the match for the best player in each game at the tournament.

References

External links
FIFA Club World Cup Morocco 2013, FIFA.com
Official Site (Archived)
FIFA Technical Report

 
2013
FIFA Club World Cup 2013
2013 in association football
2013–14 in German football
2013–14 in Moroccan football
2013–14 in Egyptian football
2013–14 in Mexican football
2013 in Brazilian football
2013–14 in New Zealand association football
2013 in Chinese football
December 2013 sports events in Africa